Stanley Clarke (born 1951) is an American jazz bassist and film composer.

Stanley Clarke may also refer to:
 Stanley Clarke (swimmer) (born 1939), English swimmer
 Stanley Clarke (businessman) (1933–2004), English businessman, property developer, horse racing enthusiast, and philanthropist 
 Stanley Calvert Clarke (died 1911), British Army officer and courtier
 Stanley E. Clarke III, United States Air Force general
 Stan Clarke (born 1960), pitcher in Major League Baseball
 Stanley Clarke (album), a 1974 album by Stanley Clarke

See also
 Stan Clark, New Zealand rugby league player